The Jhandewalan Temple is a Hindu temple near Karol Bagh in Delhi, India dedicated to the goddess Aadi Shakti. It is among the oldest temple in Delhi and located on Jhandewala road.

History

Etymology
This rocky area was named as Jhandewala during the 18th century due to the presence of a large Prayer flags.

Discovery of idol
During the 18th century, a famous cloth merchant named Badri Das often walked to the Delhi Ridge of Aravalli range, which was covered with flora and fauna. While digging near a waterfall, the idol of Jhandewali Mata and a stone lingam with carvings of nāga were found by him. Das built the temple on the spot. Since the hands of the idol were damaged during excavation, hands of silver were made and the original statue was consecrated in the cavern basement which came to be called "Maa Gufa Wali" (The Mother Goddess of Cave). A new replica of the idol was installed on the ground floor which came to be called "Maa Jhande Wali" (The Mother Goddess of Flag). Since a large prayer flag was installed by Badri Das, who came to be known as "Bhagat Badri", the place came to be known as "Jhandewala" ("the place of the flag"). Within the temple compound there are subsidiary temples of Shiva as well as Kali. The temple is run by the nonprofit organization trust "Badri Bhagat Jhandewalan Mandir Society".

Hindu Jat and Muslim riots of 1924

During the British Raj, Muslims had built a slaughterhouse close to the temple. In May 1924, on the day of Bakri Eid, the Muslims of Pahari Dhiraj slaughtered a cow - which is revered by the Hindus as sacred - in the slaughterhouse close to the Jhandewala temple. This angered the Hindu Jats of Sadar Bazaar, which led to riots among the Jats and Muslims between 11 July and 18 July, resulting in loss of life and property. Muhammad Ali Jinnah repeatedly requested Mahatma Gandhi and Indian National Congress (INC) to stop the Jats, but Gandhi and INC were unable to control the situation. Riots were eventually stopped by the police.

Religious celebrations
The lower level of the temple is where people perform Puja. The upper level of the temple has the idol of Mata Jhandewali with the idol of Saraswati and Kali. There are also idols of other deities on the upper level.

The festival of Navaratri is held twice a year at the temple. Jhandewalimata's aarti is done 4 times in a day.

See also
 Chahamanas of Shakambhari
 Devi
 Shakti

References 

Durga temples
Hindu temples in Delhi